This is a list of prices of chemical elements. Listed here are mainly average market prices for bulk trade of commodities. Data on elements' abundance in Earth's crust is added for comparison.

As of 2020, the most expensive non-synthetic element by both mass and volume is rhodium. It is followed by caesium, iridium and palladium by mass and iridium, gold and platinum by volume. Of those elements, rhodium, caesium and gold have only one stable isotope (and  respectively), iridium has two ( & ) whereas palladium and platinum both have several. Carbon in the form of diamond can be more expensive than rhodium. Per-kilogram prices of some synthetic radioisotopes range to trillions of dollars. While the difficulty of obtaining macroscopic samples of synthetic elements in part explains their high value, there has been interest in converting base metals to gold (Chrysopoeia) since ancient times, but only deeper understanding of nuclear physics has allowed the actual production of a tiny amount of gold from other elements for research purposes as demonstrated by Glenn Seaborg. However, both this and other routes of synthesis of precious metals via nuclear reactions is orders of magnitude removed from economic viability.

Chlorine, sulfur and carbon (as coal) are cheapest by mass. Hydrogen, nitrogen, oxygen and chlorine are cheapest by volume at atmospheric pressure.

When there is no public data on the element in its pure form, price of a compound is used, per mass of element contained. This implicitly puts the value of compounds' other constituents, and the cost of extraction of the element, at zero. For elements whose radiological properties are important, individual isotopes and isomers are listed. The price listing for radioisotopes is not exhaustive.

See also
2000s commodities boom

Notes

References 

Properties of chemical elements
Chemical industry
Pricing
Commodity markets